Warnervale railway station is located on the Main Northern line in New South Wales, Australia. It serves the town of Warnervale and opened on 2 September 1907.

Platforms and services
Warnervale has two side platforms. It is served by NSW TrainLink Central Coast & Newcastle Line services travelling from Sydney Central to Newcastle.

Transport links
Busways operates one route via Warnervale station:
78: Westfield Tuggerah to Lake Haven

Coastal Liner operate two routes via Warnervale station:
10: Westfield Tuggerah to Warnervale
11: Westfield Tuggerah to Lake Haven

References

External links

Warnervale station details Transport for New South Wales

Transport on the Central Coast (New South Wales)
Railway stations in Australia opened in 1907
Regional railway stations in New South Wales
Short-platform railway stations in New South Wales, 4 cars
Main North railway line, New South Wales